The Brighton Handicap was an American thoroughbred horse race run annually from 1896 through 1907 at the Brighton Beach Race Course in Brighton Beach, Coney Island, New York and in 1910 at Empire City Race Track. Open to horses age three and older, it was contested on dirt over a distance of a mile and a quarter (ten furlongs).

A premier event, in the late 19th and early part of the 20th century the Brighton Handicap, along with the Suburban Handicap at Sheepshead Bay Race Track and the Metropolitan Handicap at Morris Park Racecourse, were the big three events of the Northeastern United States racing season.

Race notes
On three occasions, 1902, 1903 and 1904, a new world record was set by the race winner. In a review of Peter Pan's win in the 1907 race in front of 40,000 fans, the New York Morning Telegraph was quoted as saying the horse "accomplished a task that completely overshadowed any previous 3-year-old performance in turf history."

Following passage of the Hart–Agnew anti-betting law by the Legislature of New York, Brighton Beach Race Course closed is doors permanently by the end of 1908. The Brighton Beach track had maintained the purse level for the Brighton Handicap by reducing purse money for other minor races or by eliminating them entirely. However, to survive, racetrack operators saw no choice but to drastically reduce the purse money being paid out which by 1910 saw an Empire City Race Track edition of the Brighton Handicap offer a purse which was one-quarter of what it had been.

Records
Speed record:
 2:02.80 – Broomstick (1904)

Most wins:
 No horse won this race more than once.

Most wins by a jockey:
 2 – Willie Simms (1897, 1898)
 2 – George Odom (1902, 1903)

Most wins by a trainer:
 2 – James G. Rowe, Sr. (1901, 1907)

Most wins by an owner:
 2 – James R. Keene (1901, 1907)

Winners

References

1896 establishments in New York City
1896 in sports in New York City
1910 disestablishments in New York (state)
1910 in sports in New York City
Brighton Beach Race Course
Defunct sports competitions in the United States
Discontinued horse races in New York City
Sports competitions in New York City
Recurring sporting events established in 1896
Recurring sporting events disestablished in 1910